Patriarch Demetrius I or Patriarch Demetrios I may refer to:

 Patriarch Demetrius I of Alexandria, ruled in 189–232
 Demetrius of Bulgaria, Patriarch of Bulgaria in 927–c. 930
 Demetrius I Qadi, Patriarch of the Melkite Greek Catholic Church in 1919–25
 Patriarch Dimitrije, Serbian Patriarch in 1920–1930
 Demetrios I of Constantinople, Ecumenical Patriarch in 1972–1991